Kadabra is a Pokémon species.

Kadabra or Cadabra may also refer to:

 Cadabra (disambiguation)
 Kadabra or Abra Kadabra (character), a DC Comics supervillain sometimes referred to as simply "Kadabra"

See also
 Abracadabra (disambiguation)